Goodbye, Boys is a 1964 Soviet drama film directed by Mikhail Kalik. The film was based on Boris Balter's short fiction Goodbye, Boys published in 1962.

Plot 
The film tells about the three boys who live in the seaside city, constantly looking at people who relax on the beach, talk about friendship, love and life in general, which will soon change dramatically with the onset of war.

Cast 
 Natalya Bogunova as Inna 
 Yevgeny Steblov as Volodya Belov (as Ye. Steblov)
 Anna Rodionova as Katya
 Nikolay Dostal as Sashka Krigger
 Victoria Fyodorova as Zhenya
 Mikhail Kononov as Viktor Anikin
 Angelina Stepanova as Nadezhda Belova, Volodya's mother
 Yefim Kopelyan as The Sheet Metal Worker
 Nikolay Grabbe as Political commissar

References

External links 
 

1964 films
1960s Russian-language films
Soviet drama films
Films based on short fiction
Mosfilm films
1964 drama films